Handa Island or simply Handa is an island off the west coast of Sutherland, Scotland.

The island is of national importance for its birdlife and maritime vegetation, and is a Scottish Wildlife Trust nature reserve, a Site of Special Scientific Interest (SSSI), and a Special Protection Area (SPA). Handa also forms part of the North-West Sutherland national scenic area, one of 40 such areas in Scotland. 

A small ferry sails to Handa from Tarbet on the mainland and boat trips operate to it from Fanagmore. The island receives five thousand visitors per annum.

Geography and geology

Handa is composed of Torridonian red sandstone and surrounded by cliffs covered with birds. In the north is a hill with two peaks, with the south and east being lower lying. The north and west have  cliffs, and there are beaches in the south and east. The Sound of Handa separates it from the mainland and smaller islands around Handa include Glas-Leac to the south, Eilean an Aigeach to the north east and Stac an t-Sealbhaig to the north.

Flora and fauna
Handa is noted for its birdlife, which includes puffins, razorbills and guillemots. The SPA designation lists six priority species: fulmar, great skua, guillemot, kittiwake, and razorbill. The breeding colonies of razorbills and guillemots on Handa are the largest in the UK, representing 11% and 9% of the total British population respectively. The arctic skua and kittiwake populations are also of national importance, representing >1% and 2% of the British population respectively. Other birds at Handa include eider ducks and oystercatchers, and seals and otters can often be seen at Boulder Bay on the island's southern coast. Dolphins, basking sharks and several species of whale regularly visit the seas surrounding Handa.

Handa is also of national importance for its maritime vegetation.  The exposed cliff tops are home to maritime grassland species that can tolerate salt, such as thrift, sea plantain and Festuca rubra. In less exposed areas can be found herb-rich grasslands which support species such as Yorkshire fog, bluebell and Scots lovage. Heather and crowberry are also widespread across the island.

History
The island's name is of mixed Gaelic and Norse origin and means "island at the sandy river".

Anciently the island was used as a burial place, and there are still the remains of a chapel in the south east, commemorated in the name Tràigh an Teampaill (Beach of the Temple). The use of Handa as burial place is thought to be due to the fact that wolves would dig up graves on the mainland so frequently that the inhabitants of Eddrachillis resorted to burying their dead on the island:

It had a population of 65 in 1841, but following the 1847 Highland Potato Famine the inhabitants emigrated to Nova Scotia. In some ways this is surprising, since it is recorded that the islanders had a fairly varied diet including oats, fish and seabirds, rather than depending heavily on a potato crop. The islanders had a parliament, similar to that of St Kilda, which met daily, and the oldest widow on the island was considered its "Queen".

The Great Stack of Handa was first climbed from the sea on 1 August 1969 by Graeme Hunter, Hamish MacInnes & Douglas Lang.

The island is now part of the Scourie Estate, owned by Dr Jean Balfour and J.C. Balfour. The Balfours leased Handa to the RSPB for 25 years, however this lease was not renewed, because the Balfours wished a Scottish-based body to run the island; as a result the Scottish Wildlife Trust (SWT) took it over. Under the SWT the island is managed by one warden and a handful of volunteers during the summer months.

Gallery

See also 

 List of islands of Scotland

Footnotes

External links

 Scottish Wildlife Trust - Handa Island
 More information and photos  at the Handa Island Skua Project

Uninhabited islands of Highland (council area)
Nature reserves in Scotland
Sites of Special Scientific Interest in North West Sutherland
Special Protection Areas in Scotland
Islands of Sutherland